Z Force, also known as Tura Brigade, was the first military brigade of Bangladesh Forces formed during the Liberation War of Bangladesh in 1971 under Major Ziaur Rahman along with the consent of the revolutionary government of Bangladesh in exile. The brigade was formed with the 1st, 3rd and 8th Battalion of East Bengal Regiment on 7 July 1971. It is the first ever complete brigade formed during the Liberation War of Bangladesh in 1971.

Background 
Bangladeshi military officers of various cantonments revolted against the Pakistani Army and started fighting against them with limited ammunition on the night of 25 March 1971 after the crackdown by Pakistani Army. But soon the military officers of Bangladesh Forces realised that such non-planned attack or resistance will not be able to create huge casualties of the foes. So they decided to form some sectors from which they can fight properly.

The guerrillas sent from the India during May–June to various sectors were ill-equipped and not properly trained and hence were unsuccessful in almost every operations. Most of the guerrillas were caught or shot dead by Pakistani Army.

The lack of communication between the Sector Commanders and the Indian Military Officers also created major casualties to the guerrillas sent by the Indian officers to Bangladesh. Wherever the guerrillas were caught or killed, Pakistani Army in search of the other members of them used to start arson in many villages and killed numerous innocent people to take revenge.

In this situation, senior military officers assumed that the war will continue for a long time and decided to form some brigades to fight with the Pakistani Army more effectively, especially in the frontiers.

Inception 
After the sector commanders' meeting held at 8, Theater Road of Kolkata, the first brigade of Bangladesh Forces was formed. Major Ziaur Rahman, who was promoted to Lieutenant Colonel during the Liberation War of Bangladesh was the senior most officer amongst the officers present there and he was given the command of the force.

Though the brigade was formed after the meeting, the decision to form the force was decided earlier. Chief of Bangladesh Forces MAG Osmani himself told Major Moinul Hossain about the decision on 13 June 1971. But according to the gazette of the Government of Bangladesh the force is known to be formed on 7 July 1971.

The headquarters of the brigade was at Teldhala of Tura in India.

Formation and training 

The 'Z Force' established their camp in the remote Tura area of Meghalaya. But with massive spirit and interest for the freedom, people of various ages and occupations gathered under the brigade.

'Z Force' had to organise themselves properly. It was formed with 1st, 3rd and 8th battalion of East Bengal Regiment. Of them the 1st Battalion of East Bengal Regiment, who revolted in Jessore Cantonment under Major Hafiz was unable to escape safely and after fighting a crucial battle only fifty of the Bengali officers and soldiers were able to reach the border. The 8th Battalion of East Bengal Regiment was a newly formed battalion with limited power. The 3rd Battalion of East Bengal Regiment also faced casualties.

In this situation, the military headquarters of Bangladesh Forces ordered Major Hafizuddin Ahmed and Major Sahriful Haq Dalim to recruit 600 youths in 1st Battalion of East Bengal Regiment and another collect 500 youths and join 'Z Force' in Tura. Major Hafizuddin Ahmed recruited 600 youths from the youth camps from Khulna-Kushtia border area. The total number of the members in 1st Battalion of East Bengal Regiment was 800 while joining the 'Z Force'. Another 500 members collected by Major Shariful Haq Dalim amplified the strength of 3rd Battalion of East Bengal Regiment. Major Moinul Hossain Chowdhury, who acted as the commanding officer of the 1st Battalion of East Bengal Regiment was asked to format the battalion. The command and the charge to organise the 3rd Battalion of East Bengal Regiment was given to Major Shafayet Zamil and the responsibility of 8th Battalion of East Bengal Regiment was given to Major AJM Aminul Haque.

After a training session of six weeks, "Z Force" turned into a valiant brigade of Bangladesh Forces.

Organogram of the brigade 
 Brigade Commander – Major Ziaur Rahman
 Brigade Major – Captain Oli Ahmed
 D-Q Officer – Captain Sadeque
 Signal Officer – Captain Abdul Halim
 Brigade Medical Officer- Dr. H K M Abdul Hye

1st East Bengal Regiment 
 Commanding Officer – Major Moinul Hossain Chowdhury (June–August) and Major Mohammad Ziauddin (August–December) 
 Second-in-Command – Captain Bazlul Ghani Patwari
 Adjutant – Flight Lieutenant Liaqat Ali Khan   
 A Company Commander – Captain Mahbubur Rahman 
 B Company Commander – Captain Hafizuddin Ahmed   
 1st C Company Commander – Lieutenant Abdul Kaiyum Chowdhury 
 2nd C Company Commander – Lieutenant S. H. B. Noor Chowdhury
 D Company Commander –  Captain Salauddin Mumtaz (July–August) and Bazlul Gani Patwary (September–December) 
 A Company Officer – Lieutenant Wakar Hasan
 B Company Officer – Lieutenant Anisur Rahman 
 Medical Officer – Lieutenant Mujibur Rahman Fakir

3rd East Bengal Regiment 
 Commanding Officer – Major Shafaat Jamil
 Second-in-Command – Captain Mohsin 
 A Company Commander – Captain Anwar Hossain
 B Company Commander – Captain Akbar Hossain   
 C Company Commander – Captain Mohsinuddin Ahmed 
 D Company Commander – Lieutenant S. I. B. Nurunnabi Khan
 M. F. Company Commander – Lieutenant Manjur Ahmed
 Company Officer – Lieutenant Fazle Hossain 
 Medical Officer – Wasiuddin

8th East Bengal Regiment 
 Commanding Officer – Major A. J. M. Aminul Haque
 Second-in-Command – Captain Kahlequzzaman Chowdhury 
 A Company Commander – Captain Amin Ahmed Chowdhury
 B Company Commander – Captain Sadeque Hossain   
 C Company Commander – Lieutenant Modasser Hossain Khan
 D Company Commander – Lieutenant Mahbubul Alam
 Company Officer – Lieutenant Imdadul Haq
 Company Officer – Lieutenant Oliul Islam 
 Company Officer – Lieutenant Munibur Rahman 
 Company Officer – Lieutenant K. M. Abu Baker

2nd Field Artillery Battery 
 Officer in Charge – Major Khandakar Abdur Rashid 
 Officer – Captain Rashed Chowdhury
 Officer – Lieutenant Sazzad Ali Zahir

Major operations

Kamalpur Border Outpost Attack 

On 31 July 1971, Mukti Bahini under the command of Major Ziaur Rahman fought against the Pakistani troops stationed in Kamalpur. Since the Kamalpur post was close to the border, it was decided that Mukti Bahini with the support of regular Indian army troops would attempt to capture the post. The Pakistani post was first subjected to artillery bombardment. The Mukti Bahini troops under the cover of supporting fire from Indian army almost reached to the mouth of Pakistani bunkers. However, once the supporting fire was stopped by Indian army, the Mukti Bahini troops were mowed down by machine-gun fire. The attack was called off because of heavy casualties. Captain Salahuddin Momtaz of Mukti Bahini was killed in this battle.

Later from 14 November to 4 December 1971, in order to capture Kamalpur, a second battle of Kamalpur took place. The Kamalpur was subsequently captured on 4 December 1971 by combined strength of Bangladesh and Indian army.

Nakshi Border Outpost Attack 
Nakshi Border Outpost was situated in the Sherpur District, where the Pakistan Army formed a strong position. The border outpost became a target of "Z" Force because of its geographical importance.

Soon Captain Amin Ahmed Chowdhury, the Commander of Alpha Company and Lieutenant Modasser Hossain Khan, the Commander of Charlie Company was sent to defeat the Pakistanis of that camp. The two companies with great speed ran into the area and were able to enter into the fifty yards region. With great show of courage, they attacked the position of Pakistani Army.

The Pakistanis fled from the camp and took shelter in a forest which was nearby. But soon they attacked the freedom fighters with mortar shell with field mines also interrupting the operation of the 'Z Force' companies.

In this battle Captain Amin Ahmed got injured from to machine gun bullets. Major Aminul Haque saved him, risking his life.

Battle at Ghashipur 
On 10 September the Delta Company of 1st Battalion of East Bengal Regiment formed a strong defence at the Ghashipur. Ghashipur was a location near the Kamalpur Border Outpost.

Ghashipur was considered as a lifeline of the strong position of Pakistan Army in Kamalpur. Pakistani Army was anxious about their safety in Kamalpur due to the strong position of the 'Z Force' in Ghashipur. To remain safe from the sudden attack of freedom fighters Pakistan Army launched an attack on the Ghashipur Defense of 'Z Force'.

The attempt of cleansing the freedom fighters from Ghashipur went up in smoke. Pakistan Army had to flee at the end of the battle after suffering huge casualties. Lance Nayek Yousuf and Subedar Mozammel of the regiment was martyred in the battle.

Other battles
The Z Force also conducted some other significant operations including the battles of Bahadurabad, Dewanganj, Tengratila, Chilmari, Roumari, Hazipara, Chotokhal, Gowainghat, Gobindaganj, Shalutikor Airport, Dhalai Tea Garden, Sylhet, Jakiganj, Fultala, Borolekha etc.

Defence of liberated zone 

One of the prime objectives of Z Force was to cover the liberated zones in Northern Bangladesh during the Liberation War of Bangladesh. As a part of this operations Z Force liberated many areas and set up defence to save those areas from Pakistan Army from August 1971.

Establishment of administration in Roumari 

Roumari, an area from Kurigram was liberated in late August. After being acquired by the Z Force, Ziaur Rahman directed Lieutenant S. I. B. Nurunnabi Khan of 3rd East Bengal Regiment, to establish an administration on behalf of the Provisional Government of Bangladesh. Shafaat Jamil was asked to set up formidable defence to save the area from further invasion of Pakistan Army.

Lieutenant Nabi after getting the order, formed a committee of eminent citizens of that area to establish an administration and make it properly functional. He formed some offices and other establishments including a hospital in Roumari within 27 August. Ziaur Rahman inaugurated the first ever administration system in a liberated area of independent Bangladesh on 27 August 1971.

NBC Network made a documentary that included the liberated zone of Roumari which was entitled as A country made for disaster.

See also 
 S Force (Bangladesh)
 K Force (Bangladesh)

Bibliography 
 .
 .
 .
 .
 .
 .

References

Bangladesh Liberation War
Ziaur Rahman